San Miguel Acatán is a municipality in the Guatemalan department of Huehuetenango.  The Mayan language of Akateko is spoken here.

Municipalities of the Huehuetenango Department